A list of animated feature films first released in 1977.

Highest-grossing animated films of the year

See also
 List of animated television series of 1977

References

Feature films
1977
1977-related lists